Venkalam is a 1993 Indian Malayalam-language film, directed by Bharathan and written by A. K. Lohithadas. The movie features Murali, Manoj K. Jayan and Urvashi in the lead roles. The film deals with the issue of Polyandry, a prevalent tradition among the Kammalar community in Kerala.

Cast 
 Murali as Gopalan
 Manoj K. Jayan as Unnikrishnan
 Urvashi as Thankamani
 KPAC Lalitha as Kunjipennu
 Sonia as Sulochana
 Kuthiravattam Pappu
 Mala Aravindan as Ayyappan
 Ragini as Karthyayani
 Philomina as Grandmother
 Priyanka as Nadathara Kanakam
 Nedumudi Venu as Chathukutti
 Innocent as Kandappan
 Seena Antony as Indira
 M. S. Thripunithura as Damodaran Nampoothiri
 Salu Kuttanadu
 Niyas Backer
 Bindu Panicker as Leela (cameo as Gopalan's ex-lover)

Soundtrack 

The male version of the song "Pathu Veluppinu" was included in the music cassettes and CDs although it was not included in the movie. This song earned its singer Biju Narayanan a place in the Malayalam music industry.

References

External links 
 

1993 films
1990s Malayalam-language films
Films shot in Palakkad
Films shot in Ottapalam
Films with screenplays by A. K. Lohithadas
Films directed by Bharathan